Moods for Moderns was a power pop band from Detroit, Michigan, featuring Nathan Beale (guitar, vox), Ben Force (bass, vocals), and Dave Shettler (percussion, synthesizers, vocals).

Named after an Elvis Costello song from Armed Forces, Moods for Moderns were a Detroit area band with a mix of psychedelic, mod, bubblegum, and power pop influences.

External links 
 [ Allmusic]
 Metro Times Detroit

Indie rock musical groups from Michigan
Mod revival groups
Musical groups from Detroit
Doghouse Records artists